Mulliner may refer to:

People
 Stephen Mulliner, croquet world champion
 Thomas Mulliner (around 1545–1570), Oxford organist who compiled the commonplace Mulliner Book
 The Mulliner family (18th cen. onwards), British coachbuilders from c. 1760 to c. 1908:
 Francis Mulliner (1765–1819) of Mulliner Northampton
 Francis Mulliner (1789–1841) of Mulliner Northampton, including Leamington Priors
 Francis Mulliner (1824–1886) Mulliner Northampton, Mulliner Liverpool
 Augustus Greville Mulliner (1861–1905) of Mulliner Liverpool, including A. G. Mulliner Body Co. and Accrington
 Henry Mulliner (1827–1887) of Mulliner Leamington at Leamington Priors
 Arthur Felton Mulliner (1859–1946) of Arthur Mulliner
 Herbert Hall Mulliner (1861–1924) of Mulliners (Birmingham)
 Robert Bouverie Mulliner (1830–1902) of Mulliner Chiswick
 Henry Jervis Mulliner (1870–1967) of H. J. Mulliner
 William Rice Mulliner (1834–1863), army officer

Fiction

 Mr Mulliner, character from the short stories of P. G. Wodehouse, who frequents the Angler's Rest public house where he entertains the others with stories about his remarkably numerous and far-flung Mulliner relatives.
 Archibald Mulliner, character from the short stories of P. G. Wodehouse
 Rev. Augustine Mulliner, character from the short stories of P. G. Wodehouse

Companies
Several coachbuilding businesses led by individuals from the Mulliner family (see below):
 Mulliner Northampton, including Leamington Priors (c. 1760–1940)
 Mulliner London (1882–1940)
 Arthur Mulliner (1910?–1940)
 Mulliner Liverpool, including A. G. Mulliner Body Co. and Accrington (1854–?)
 Mulliner Chiswick (1870–1991)
 H. J. Mulliner & Co. (1897–1991)
 Mulliner Park Ward (1961–1991)
 Mulliners (Birmingham) (c. 1888–1960)